Dorance Armstrong Jr. (born June 10, 1997) is an American football defensive end for the Dallas Cowboys of the National Football League (NFL). He played college football at Kansas.

Early years
Armstrong attended North Shore Senior High School in Cloverleaf, Texas, where he played defensive end. As a junior, he was named second-team All-District. As a senior, he received first-team All-district honors. He also played basketball.

College career

He accepted a football scholarship from the University of Kansas. As a freshman, he appeared in all 12 games and started the last 5 contests at defensive end. He registered 23 tackles, 5 tackles for loss, 3.5 sacks (second on the team), and 4 passes defensed (second on the team).

As a sophomore, he had a breakout season as the starter at left defensive end. He led the team and was second in the conference with 10 sacks, the most by a school player since 2008. He posted 56 tackles (fifth on the team), 20 tackles for loss (fifth in school history), 5 quarterback hurries, 3 forced fumbles, and 2 fumbles recoveries. He had a career-high 11 tackles (3 for loss), 2 sacks, one forced fumble, and one fumble recovery against the University of Texas.

As a junior, his role in the defense changed and his production regressed. He made 63 total tackles (third on the team), 9 tackles for loss, 1.5 sacks, 7 quarterback hurries, 4 passes defensed, 3 forced fumbles, and one fumble recovery. On January 3, 2018, he announced that he would forgo his senior year to enter the 2018 NFL Draft. He finished his career with 142 tackles and 15.5 sacks.

College statistics

Professional career

Armstrong was selected by the Dallas Cowboys in the fourth round (116th overall) of the 2018 NFL Draft. Armstrong made his first career start on October 14, 2018 against the Jacksonville Jaguars. He recorded his first career sack on November 5, in a game against the Tennessee Titans, a sack he split with Caraun Reid. Entering the league as a 21-year-old rookie, he finished the season with 13 tackles, 8 solo, and a half of a sack, while playing in fifteen of the Cowboys sixteen games (one start).

In 2019, he appeared in 15 games with no starts. He tallied 16 tackles, 2 sacks, 9 quarterback pressures, and one forced fumble. He recorded the first full sack of his career against the Green Bay Packers. He had his first career forced fumble against the New York Giants. 

In 2020, he appeared in 16 games with 2 starts. He registered 33 tackles, one for loss.

On March 17, 2022, Armstrong signed a two-year contract extension with the Cowboys.

References

External links
Kansas Jayhawks bio

Living people
1997 births
Players of American football from Houston
American football defensive ends
Kansas Jayhawks football players
Dallas Cowboys players